Martin Rump (born on 2 April 1996) is the first Estonian racing driver competing in the 24 Hours of Le Mans. He is currently set to compete in European Le Mans Series with Proton Competition.

Rump participated in endurance events such as the European Le Mans Series, the Asian Le Mans Series and the Intercontinental GT Challenge. Currently he is racing in European Le Mans Series.

Racing Record

Complete 24 Hours of Le Mans results

Complete European Le Mans Series results
(key) (Races in bold indicate pole position; results in italics indicate fastest lap)

References

1996 births
Living people
Estonian racing drivers
24 Hours of Le Mans drivers
Asian Le Mans Series drivers
European Le Mans Series drivers
Sportspeople from Tallinn